The 2015 season is Penangs 89th competitive season, 2nd consecutive season in the second tier of Malaysian football since promoted in 2013, and 94th year in existence as a football club. The season covers the period from 1 November 2014 to 31 December 2015.

Squad

First-team squad

Transfers

1st leg

In:

Out:

Competitions

Malaysia Premier League

League table

References

2015
Malaysian football clubs 2015 season
Penang F.C.